

P 

 1740 Paavo Nurmi
 
 
 
 
 
 
 
 
 
 
 
 
 363 Padua
 
 1061 Paeonia
 1032 Pafuri
 
 
 
 
 
 
 
 
 
 
 1535 Päijänne
 
 953 Painleva
 
 
 12482 Pajka
 
 1889 Pakhmutova
 
 
 1921 Pala
 1834 Palach
 
 
 
 2456 Palamedes
 
 
 415 Palatia
 
 6793 Palazzolo
 
 
 10001 Palermo
 49 Pales
 
 
 
 4832 Palinurus
 914 Palisana
 
 
 2 Pallas
 372 Palma
 
 
 
 
 
 
 
 
 
 
 
 
 
 
 1243 Pamela
 
 
 
 
 
 539 Pamina
 
 
 
 4450 Pan
 
 
 
 
 
 
 
 
 
 
 
 2674 Pandarus
 
 
 55 Pandora
 
 
 
 
 
 
 
 
 1444 Pannonia
 70 Panopaea
 
 
 
 
 4754 Panthoos
 
 
 
 
 
 
 
 
 
 3176 Paolicchi
 
 
 
 
 
 
 
 
 
 471 Papagena
 
 
 
 
 
 
 
 
 
 
 
 
 
 
 3963 Paradzhanov
 
 1779 Paraná
 
 
 
 1857 Parchomenko
 
 
 
 
 
 347 Pariana
 
 
 
 3317 Paris
 
 
 
 
 
 
 
 
 
 
 
 
 
 
 
 
 
 
 11 Parthenope
 
 
 
 
 
 888 Parysatis
 
 
 
 
 
 
 
 
 
 
 
 
 
 
 
 
 4804 Pasteur
 
 
 
 
 
 451 Patientia
 
 
 
 
 
 
 
 
 1347 Patria
 
 436 Patricia
 
 
 
 
 
 
 
 
 
 
 
 
 
 
 
 617 Patroclus
 
 1791 Patsayev
 
 
 
 
 
 
 
 
 
 
 
 
 
 
 
 
 
 
 
 
 
 
 
 
 
 
 
 
 
 
 
 
 278 Paulina
 
 4674 Pauling
 
 
 
 
 
 
 
 
 
 
 
 
 
 
 
 
 
 
 
 
 
 
 
 
 
 
 
 
 
 
 537 Pauly
 
 
 
 
 
 
 
 
 
 
 
 
 
 
 
 1007 Pawlowia
 1152 Pawona
 679 Pax
 
 2039 Payne-Gaposchkin
 
 
 
 
 
 
 
 
 
 
 
 
 
 
 
 
 
 
 
 
 
 
 
 
 
 
 
 
 
 
 
 
 
 
 
 
 2893 Peiroos
 
 
 118 Peitho
 
 
 1190 Pelagia
 
 
 
 2202 Pele
 
 
 
 
 
 
 
 
 3850 Peltier
 
 
 1429 Pemba
 
 
 
 
 
 
 201 Penelope
 
 
 
 
 
 
 
 271 Penthesilea
 
 15224 Penttilä
 
 
 
 
 
 
 
 1102 Pepita
 
 
 
 
 1680 Per Brahe
 554 Peraga
 
 
 
 
 
 
 
 
 
 
 12929 Periboea
 
 
 
 
 
 
 
 
 
 
 
 
 
 
 
 
 
 
 
 
 
 
 399 Persephone
 975 Perseverantia
 
 
 3953 Perth
 
 
 
 
 
 
 
 
 
 
 
 
 
 
 
 
 
 
 
 
 
 
 
 
 
 
 
 
 
 
 
 
 
 
 
 
 
 
 
 
 
 
 13154 Petermrva
 
 
 
 
 
 
 
 
 
 
 
 
 
 
 
 
 
 
 
 
 
 
 
 
 
 
 
 
 
 
 
 482 Petrina
 
 
 
 830 Petropolitana
 
 
 
 
 
 
 4790 Petrpravec
 
 
 
 
 
 
 
 968 Petunia
 
 
 
 
 
 
 
 
 
 174 Phaedra
 
 322 Phaeo
 3200 Phaethon
 296 Phaëtusa
 
 
 
 23135 Pheidas
 
 
 
 
 
 2357 Phereclos
 
 
 274 Philagoria
 
 
 
 
 
 
 
 280 Philia
 
 
 
 
 
 
 
 
 
 977 Philippa
 631 Philippina
 
 
 
 
 
 
 
 
 1869 Philoctetes
 196 Philomela
 227 Philosophia
 
 
 
 
 
 
 25 Phocaea
 
 4543 Phoinix
 5145 Pholus
 443 Photographica
 1291 Phryne
 189 Phthia
 
 556 Phyllis
 
 4185 Phystech
 614 Pia
 
 
 
 
 1000 Piazzia
 
 
 20488 Pic-du-Midi
 
 
 
 
 
 1366 Piccolo
 
 
 
 803 Picka
 
 784 Pickeringia
 
 
 
 
 1523 Pieksämäki
 1536 Pielinen
 
 
 
 
 
 
 
 
 
 
 1392 Pierre
 
 
 
 
 
 312 Pierretta
 
 
 
 
 
 
 
 
 
 
 
 
 
 
 
 
 
 
 
 
 
 1990 Pilcher
 
 
 
 
 
 
 
 
 
 
 
 
 
 
 
 
 
 
 
 
 
 
 
 19367 Pink Floyd
 
 
 
 
 
 
 
 
 
 
 
 
 
 
 648 Pippa
 
 
 
 
 
 
 
 
 1082 Pirola
 
 
 
 
 2672 Písek
 
 
 
 
 
 
 37432 Piszkéstető
 
 
 
 
 
 
 484 Pittsburghia
 
 
 
 
 
 
 
 
 
 
 
 1069 Planckia
 
 
 
 
 
 2905 Plaskett
 
 
 
 
 
 
 
 
 
 
 
 
 
 
 
 
 
 
 
 
 
 
 
 
 
 
 6615 Plutarchos
 134340 Pluto
 2613 Plzeň
 
 
 14974 Počátky
 
 
 4086 Podalirius
 13062 Podarkes
 
 
 
 
 
 
 
 
 
 946 Poësia
 
 
 
 1830 Pogson
 
 
 
 
 
 
 
 
 
 
 142 Polana
 
 
 
 
 
 
 
 
 
 
 
 1708 Pólit
 4867 Polites
 
 
 
 
 
 
 
 
 1112 Polonia
 
 2006 Polonskaya
 
 
 
 
 
 4708 Polydoros
 33 Polyhymnia
 
 15094 Polymele
 
 
 
 3709 Polypoites
 
 595 Polyxena
 
 308 Polyxo
 
 
 32 Pomona
 203 Pompeja
 
 
 1305 Pongola
 
 
 
 
 
 
 
 
 
 
 
 
 
 
 
 
 3074 Popov
 
 
 
 
 
 
 
 1499 Pori
 
 
 
 
 
 
 
 
 
 
 757 Portlandia
 
 
 
 
 
 1757 Porvoo
 
 1131 Porzia
 
 4341 Poseidon
 
 
 
 
 
 
 
 
 
 1484 Postrema
 
 
 
 
 
 
 
 1345 Potomac
 
 
 
 
 
 
 
 4348 Poulydamas
 
 
 
 
 
 
 
 
 
 
 
 420356 Praamzius
 
 
 
 
 
 
 
 
 
 
 
 
 
 
 
 
 
 
 547 Praxedis
 
 1238 Predappia
 
 
 
 
 
 
 
 
 
 
 
 
 
 
 
 
 790 Pretoria
 
 
 
 
 
 
 
 
 
 529 Preziosa
 
 884 Priamus
 
 
 
 
 1359 Prieska
 
 
 
 
 
 
 
 970 Primula
 508 Princetonia
 
 
 
 
 
 
 
 997 Priska
 1192 Prisma
 
 
 
 
 
 902 Probitas
 
 
 194 Prokne
 
 
 
 
 1809 Prometheus
 
 
 26 Proserpina
 
 
 
 3540 Protesilaos
 
 
 12444 Prothoon
 
 
 147 Protogeneia
 
 
 
 474 Prudentia
 
 
 
 
 
 
 7543 Prylis
 
 261 Prymno
 
 
 
 10711 Pskov
 16 Psyche
 5011 Ptah
 4001 Ptolemaeus
 
 
 
 
 
 
 
 
 
 
 
 
 
 
 
 
 
 
 762 Pulcova
 
 
 
 1209 Pumma
 
 1659 Punkaharju
 
 
 57868 Pupin
 
 
 
 
 
 
 3494 Purple Mountain
 
 
 
 
 
 
 
 
 
 
 
 
 
 
 2122 Pyatiletka
 
 
 
 
 
 14871 Pyramus
 632 Pyrrha
 5283 Pyrrhus
 
 
 432 Pythia

See also 
 List of minor planet discoverers
 List of observatory codes

References 
 

Lists of minor planets by name